"And No Matches" is a single by German techno group Scooter. It was released as the second single from their 2007 album Jumping All Over The World.

Samples
"And No Matches" samples the 1998 song "Big Big World" by Emilia, taken from the 1999 album of the same name.
The song along with "Enola Gay" from the same album samples part of the drum beat to the original Orchestral Manoeuvres in the Dark version of "Enola Gay".

Track listings
CD Maxi
 "And No Matches" (Radio Version) (3:32)
 "And No Matches" ('Fresh Off The Plane' Club Mix) (6:33)
 "And No Matches" (Extended Version) (5:35)
 "Up In Smoke" (5:07)
 "And No Matches" (The Video) (3:32)

12"
 "And No Matches" (Extended Version) (5:35)
 "And No Matches" ('Fresh Off The Plane' Club Mix) (6:33)

Download
 "And No Matches" (Radio Version) (3:32)
 "And No Matches" ('Fresh Off The Plane' Club Mix) (6:33)
 "And No Matches" (Extended Version) (5:35)
 "Up In Smoke" (5:07)

Music video
The And No Matches music video features the Sheffield Jumpers performing Jumpstyle to the chorus while shots of H.P. Baxxter comprise the lyrical parts of the music video.

Charts

References

2008 singles
Scooter (band) songs
Jumpstyle songs
Songs written by Jens Thele
Songs written by H.P. Baxxter
Songs written by Rick J. Jordan
Songs written by Michael Simon (DJ)
Songs written by Emilia Rydberg
2007 songs